School Lake is a natural lake in South Dakota, in the United States.

School Lake was on public land within a school section, hence the name.

See also
List of lakes in South Dakota

References

Lakes of South Dakota
Lakes of Deuel County, South Dakota